The Četvrta NL Bjelovar-Koprivnica-Virovitica (Croatian) also known as the NL BJ-KC-VT is a fifth tier league competition in the Croatian football league system. The league was formed in 2014. The league covers clubs from Virovitica-Podravina County, Bjelovar-Bilogora County and Koprivnica-Križevci County.

2022-2023 Teams

List of winners

See also
 Croatian football league system

References

5
2014 establishments in Croatia
Croa